Alex F. Yaworski (born 1907, Odessa, Imperial Russia, now Ukraine; died March 25, 1997) was a visual artist who specialized in Watercolor painting and Illustration.

Early life 

Alex F. Yaworski's parents, Anton and Anna, married right before the Russo-Japanese War of 1904-1905. His father, Anton, was conscripted into the Czarist Army and maintained cavalry horses, while his mother, Anna was employed as a cook for a group of generals. Alex was born December 29, 1907. They immigrated to the United States through Canada when Alex was almost two years old and settled in Superior, Wisconsin During his lifetime, Superior and environs were the subject matter of many of his paintings. He found fascination in the Northern Wisconsin scenic beauty as well as the waterfront shipyards, freight yards, and grain elevators of the Duluth/Superior Twin Ports region. As early as grade school, he was determined to become an artist.
In 1927, he left Superior for Chicago, Illinois to attend The American Academy of Art. He graduated in 1931. He taught life drawing while still a student and continued teaching there for a period of time after graduation.

Career 

Yaworski's first full time job out of school was working in the art department of the Chicago Tribune.
After a few years as an employee of the Tribune, he became a freelance artist and worked for Sears Roebuck and other clients. In the 1940s, he again became a full time employee but this time for Poster Products in Chicago. While there during World War II, Alex illustrated many posters and advertisements for the war bond effort. After the war, he returned to freelancing for multiple companies. From 1946 through 1954, he designed and illustrated Sears Roebuck’s Christmas Book covers.

Personal life 
Alex was doing work for Sears Roebuck when he met his then-to-be wife Maurine who was working in their advertising department. She already had a daughter named Ernine from her previous marriage. Together, they formed a family of three when they got married in June,1936 and had son Don twelve years later. Maurine died in 1983 and in 1991 after spending over 60 years in Chicago, Alex moved to Kansas City, MO to be closer to his son. In his final years, he continued to paint and he enjoyed his visits to the Nelson-Atkins Museum of Art. Alex F. Yaworski died on March 25, 1997.

Notable Mentions 
 Featured in "Seascapes and Landscapes in Watercolor" edited by Norman Kent, Watson-Guptill, 1956
 Included in articles featured in "American Artists Magazine," a Watson-Guptill publication 
 Featured in "Acrylic Watercolor Painting" by Wendon Blake, 1970, ISBN 0-8230-4640-0
 Featured in Watson-Guptill book "Watercolorists at Work," by Susan E. Meyer and Norman Kent, 1972, ISBN 0-8230-5690-2
 Cited in Book, "One Hundred Years, 1887-1987:Catalog of the Collection, Union League Club of Chicago" by Dennis J. Loy and Caroline Honig, 1987, LCCN 7-81198 
 Included in the book "Watercolor: Let the Medium Do It" by Valfred Thelin and Patricia Burlin, Watson-Guptill, 1988, ISBN 0-8230-5667-8, CIP 88-21061  
 Included in the book "Handmade Holiday Cards from 20th Century Artists" from the Collections of the Smithsonian’s Archives of American Art, by Mary Savig, Smithsonian Books, 2012, ISBN 978-1-58834-330-7

Juror 
 97th Annual Exhibition of the American Watercolor Society, New York, NY, 1964
 49th Annual Hoosier Salon, Indianapolis, Indiana, 1973
 Adirondacks National Exhibition of American Watercolors, Old Forge, NY, 1984
 MidSouthern Watercolorists in Little Rock, Arkansas, 1974
 Midwest Watercolor Society in Manitowoc, Wisconsin, 1978
 Midwest Watercolor Society in Duluth, Minnesota, 1979
 Iowa Watercolor Society in Des Moines, Iowa, 1981
 51st Annual Indiana Artists Club, Indianapolis, Indiana, 1983

Honors and awards 
 The Dagmar Haagstrom Tribble Purchase Prize for the American Watercolor Society 
 The Emily Goldsmith Award for the American Watercolor Society 
 Container Corporation Award for the Artists Guild of Chicago
 Naomi Lorne Memorial Award for the American Watercolor Society
 Honorary membership in the Artists Guild of Chicago
 Watercolor USA Purchase Award
 Watercolor USA Honor Society
 The Grumbacher Hyplar Award for the National Society of Painters in Casein and Acrylic
 The Gold Award for Calendars for The Graphic Arts Association
 Honorable Mention for the National Society of Painters in Casein and Acrylic
 Union League Artist Member Award for the Union League Civic & Arts Foundation
 Adirondack Wilderness Medal for the Adirondacks National Exhibition of American Watercolors
 Frank W. Chesrow Gold Medal for the Municipal Art League of Chicago
 Life member status in the American Watercolor Society
 Award of Excellence for Outstanding Achievement in Fine Art, Municipal Art League of Chicago
 AFY File included in the Artists File Initiative at the Spencer Art Reference Library, Nelson-Atkins Museum of Art, Kansas City, Missouri

References

Sources 
 "One Hundred Years, 1887-1987: Catalog of the Collection, Union League Club of Chicago," by Dennis J. Loy, Caroline Honig, 1987, LCCN 87-81198

External links 
 Record Alex Yaworski Christmas card to Ralph Fabri | Collections Search Center, Smithsonian Institution
 25 Apr 1965, 2 - Chicago Tribune at Newspapers.com
 21 Jul 1968, 153 - Chicago Tribune at Newspapers.com
 30 May 1952, 16 - Chicago Tribune at Newspapers.com
 22 May 1966, 118 - Chicago Tribune at Newspapers.com
 1 Dec 1968, 1 - Chicago Tribune at Newspapers.com
 12 Oct 1974, 64 - Chicago Tribune at Newspapers.com
 6 Feb 1955, 171 - Chicago Tribune at Newspapers.com
 15 Dec 1971, 1 - Chicago Tribune at Newspapers.com
 24 Jul 1966, 64 - Chicago Tribune at Newspapers.com
 12 Feb 1955, 13 - Chicago Tribune at Newspapers.com
 4 Oct 1953, 106 - Chicago Tribune at Newspapers.com
 25 Nov 1958, 37 - Chicago Tribune at Newspapers.com
 Artists' File Initiative

1907 births
1997 deaths